The Syrian Unity party was set up by Syrian emigres in Cairo at the end of 1918. Its founders included signatories to the memorandum that resulted in the Declaration to the Seven and persons previously connected with the Ottoman Party for Administrative Decentralization. In August 1921, the party organized the Syrian–Palestinian Congress in Geneva with a view to influencing the terms of the proposed League of Nations mandate over the region.

Members and Platform
Michel Lutfallah;
Rashid Rida;
Rafiq al-Azm;
Haqqi al-Azm;
Abd al-Rahman Shahbandar;
Khaled al-Hakim;
Sheikh Kamal al-Qassab;
Salim Sarkis;
Iskander 'Ammun;
Muhibb al-Din al-Khatib;

The party platform stated:

Background

Before the war, Cairo was a center of activity for the developing Arab independence movement, its permissive atmosphere  and community of Syrian emigres was a magnet for political exiles.

On 23 October 1918 following the Sinai and Palestine Campaign of World War I, the Occupied Enemy Territory Administration was established over Levantine provinces of the former Ottoman Empire. Earlier, on 1 October 1918, General Allenby had been authorized to permit the hoisting of the Arab flag at Damascus.

The political scene in Damascus was dominated by three organizations, al-Nadi al-'Arabi (the Arab Club with strong Palestinian connections), Hizbal-Istiqlal al-'Arabi (the Arab Independence Party connected to al-Fatat) and Al-'Ahd (an Iraqi-run officers association).

An Arab government was announced on 5 October 1918 and gained de facto independence after the withdrawal of the British forces on 26 November 1919. The Arab Kingdom of Syria was an unrecognized state proclaimed as a Kingdom on 8 March 1920 and existed until 25 July 1920. During its brief existence, the kingdom was led by Sharif Hussein bin Ali's son Faisal bin Hussein. Despite its claims to the territory of Greater Syria, Faisal's government controlled a limited area and was dependent on Britain which, along with France, generally opposed the idea of a Greater Syria and refused to recognize the kingdom. The kingdom surrendered to French forces on 25 July 1920.

References

Bibliography

Arab nationalism in Syria
Arab nationalist organizations
Syrian nationalism
Political organisations based in Egypt